Cyrille Moktar Diabaté (born October 6, 1973) is a retired French mixed martial artist and kickboxer. He has also competed in shoot boxing and Muay Thai. He has fought at Palace Fighting Championship, Tachi Palace Fights, PRIDE, ShoXC, Deep, Cage Rage and the Ultimate Fighting Championship.

Mixed martial arts career

Pride Fighting Championships
Diabaté then faced off against Maurício Rua at Pride Final Conflict Absolute. After 5:29 of the first round, Rua defeated Diabaté via TKO (stomps). This loss led to Diabaté heading for smaller organizations.

His first fight was in England, for the Cage Rage promotion. He defeated Ryan Robinson via armbar and followed this up with a blood-soaked decision victory in a ShoXC card, where he faced Jaime Fletcher.

Diabaté defeated Marcus Hicks via submission (armbar) after just 89 seconds. This win was his fourth in a row and was followed up by a win over Rob Smith via submission.

Ultimate Fighting Championship
Cyrille appeared frequently as a striking coach for Team Henderson in season 9 of The Ultimate Fighter. It was announced in February 2010 that Diabaté had signed a four fight contract with the UFC.

In his debut at UFC 114 he defeated Luiz Cané via TKO in the first round. Diabaté later expressed disappointment in his own performance, having had to "survive a flash knockout" early in the first round.

In his second appearance, Diabaté lost to Alexander Gustafsson on October 16, 2010 at UFC 120. In the fight, he was dominated by the Swede for the entire first round standing, and in the second round he was taken down early and submitted with a rear naked choke. This was his first loss in four years.

For his third UFC fight, Diabaté faced Steve Cantwell on March 3, 2011 at UFC Live: Sanchez vs. Kampmann. He won the fight via unanimous decision.

Diabaté fought Anthony Perosh on November 5, 2011 at UFC 138. He lost the bout against Perosh via submission due to a rear naked choke in the second round.

Diabaté was expected to face Jörgen Kruth on April 14, 2012 at UFC on Fuel TV 2. However, Kruth was forced out of the bout with an injury and replaced by Tom DeBlass. Diabaté won the fight via majority decision.

Diabaté was briefly linked to a bout with Fabio Maldonado on November 17, 2012 at UFC 154. However, Maldonado was pulled from the bout and faced Glover Teixeira on October 13, 2012 at UFC 153, replacing an injured Quinton Jackson.  Diabaté instead faced Chad Griggs at the event. Diabate defeated Griggs via first round rear naked choke submission.

Diabaté faced Jimi Manuwa on February 16, 2013 at UFC on Fuel TV: Barão vs. McDonald.  Manuwa was declared the winner (TKO) after Diabaté was unable to continue after tearing a calf muscle near the end of the first round.

Diabaté faced Ilir Latifi at UFC Fight Night 37. Before the fight, Diabaté announced he will retire from MMA regardless of the bout's outcome. He lost the fight via submission in the first round. After his loss to Latifi, Diabaté made his retirement from combat sports official.

Kickboxing record (Incomplete)

|-
|
|Win
| Michael Bisping
|CWFC: Strike Force 1
|Coventry, West Midlands, England
|Decision (Unanimous)
|align="center"|4
|align="center"|3:00
|-
|
|Loss
| Aleksandr Pitchkounov
|Ichigeki Paris 2005
|Paris, France
|Decision (Unanimous)
|align="center"|5
|align="center"|3:00
|-
|
|Loss
| Alexey Ignashov
|MT ONE
|Saint-Pierre, Réunion
|Decision
|align="center"|5
|align="center"|3:00
|-
|
|Loss
| Petar Majstorović
|K-1 Spain Grand Prix 2003 in Barcelona
|Barcelona, Spain
|Decision (Unanimous)
|align="center"|3
|align="center"|3:00
|-
|
|Win
| Damián García
|K-1 Spain Grand Prix 2003 in Barcelona
|Barcelona, Spain
|KO (Strikes)
|align="center"|1
|align="center"|N/A
|-
|
|Win
| Lee Hasdell
|Shoot Boxing: S Volume 1 
|Tokyo, Japan
|TKO (Doctor Stoppage)
|align="center"|4
|align="center"|2:18
|-
|
|Win
| Rick Roufus
|I.S.K.A. Championship
|Las Vegas, Nevada, United States
|TKO (Doctor Stoppage)
|align="center"|3
|align="center"|3:00
|-
|-
| colspan=9 | Legend:

Mixed martial arts record

|-
| Loss
| align=center| 19–10–1
| Ilir Latifi
| Submission (ninja choke)
| UFC Fight Night: Gustafsson vs. Manuwa
| 
| align=center| 1
| align=center| 3:02
| London, England
|
|-
| Loss
| align=center| 19–9–1
| Jimi Manuwa
| TKO (retirement)
| UFC on Fuel TV: Barão vs. McDonald
| 
| align=center| 1
| align=center| 5:00
| London, England
| 
|-
| Win
| align=center| 19–8–1
| Chad Griggs
| Submission (rear-naked choke)
| UFC 154
| 
| align=center| 1
| align=center| 2:24
| Montreal, Quebec, Canada
| 
|-
| Win
| align=center| 18–8–1
| Tom DeBlass
| Decision (majority)
| UFC on Fuel TV: Gustafsson vs. Silva
| 
| align=center| 3
| align=center| 5:00
| Stockholm, Sweden
| 
|-
| Loss
| align=center| 17–8–1
| Anthony Perosh
| Submission (rear-naked choke)
| UFC 138
| 
| align=center| 2
| align=center| 3:09
| Birmingham, England
| 
|-
| Win
| align=center| 17–7–1
| Steve Cantwell
| Decision (unanimous)
| UFC Live: Sanchez vs. Kampmann
| 
| align=center| 3
| align=center| 5:00
| Louisville, Kentucky, United States
| 
|-
| Loss
| align=center| 16–7–1
| Alexander Gustafsson
| Submission (rear-naked choke)
| UFC 120
| 
| align=center| 2
| align=center| 2:41
| London, England
| 
|-
| Win
| align=center| 16–6–1
| Luiz Cané
| TKO (punches)
| UFC 114
| 
| align=center| 1
| align=center| 2:13
| Las Vegas, Nevada, United States
| 
|-
| Win
| align=center| 15–6–1
| Rob Smith
| Submission (rear-naked choke)
| TPF 2: Brawl in the Hall
| 
| align=center| 1
| align=center| 1:47
| Lemoore, California, United States
| 
|-
| Win
| align=center| 14–6–1
| Marcus Hicks
| Submission (armbar)
| AMMA 1: First Blood
| 
| align=center| 1
| align=center| 1:29
| Edmonton, Alberta, Canada
| 
|-
| Win
| align=center| 13–6–1
| Lodune Sincaid
| TKO (doctor stoppage)
| PFC 12: High Stakes
| 
| align=center| 2
| align=center| 1:15
| Lemoore, California, United States
| 
|-
| Win
| align=center| 12–6–1
| Jaime Fletcher
| Decision (unanimous)
| ShoXC: Hamman vs. Suganuma 2
| 
| align=center| 3
| align=center| 5:00
| Friant, California, United States
| 
|-
| Win
| align=center| 11–6–1
| Ryan Robinson
| Submission (armbar)
| Cage Rage 21
| 
| align=center| 1
| align=center| 1:15
| London, England
| 
|-
| Loss
| align=center| 10–6–1
| Maurício Rua
| TKO (stomps)
| Pride FC - Final Conflict Absolute
| 
| align=center| 1
| align=center| 5:29
| Saitama, Japan
| 
|-
| Win
| align=center| 10–5–1
| Yasuhito Namekawa
| KO (flying knee)
| Real Rhythm: 4th Stage
| 
| align=center| 2
| align=center| 1:50
| Osaka, Japan
| 
|-
| Win
| align=center| 9–5–1
| Yasuhito Namekawa
| KO (punches)
| Deep: 24 Impact
| 
| align=center| 2
| align=center| 2:22
| Tokyo, Japan
| 
|-
| Win
| align=center| 8–5–1
| Takahiro Oba
| Submission (rear-naked choke)
| Real Rhythm: 3rd Stage
| 
| align=center| 2
| align=center| 3:47
| Osaka, Japan
| 
|-
| Win
| align=center| 7–5–1
| Mu Jin-Na
| KO (head kick and punches)
| Real Rhythm: 2nd Stage
| 
| align=center| 1
| align=center| 1:28
| Osaka, Japan
| 
|-
| Loss
| align=center| 6–5–1
| Fábio Piamonte
| Submission (arm-triangle choke)
| Cage Rage 12
| 
| align=center| 1
| align=center| 2:09
| London, England
| 
|-
| Loss
| align=center| 6–4–1
| Renato Sobral
| Submission (guillotine choke)
| Cage Rage 9
| 
| align=center| 1
| align=center| 3:38
| London, England
| 
|-
| Loss
| align=center| 6–3–1
| Arman Gambaryan
| Decision (unanimous)
| M-1 MFC: Middleweight GP
| 
| align=center| 3
| align=center| 5:00
| St. Petersburg, Russia
| 
|-
| Loss
| align=center| 6–2–1
| Rodney Glunder
| Decision (unanimous)
| 2 Hot 2 Handle
| 
| align=center| 2
| align=center| 3:00
| Amsterdam, Netherlands
| 
|-
| Win
| align=center| 6–1–1
| James Žikic
| Decision (unanimous)
| EF 1: Genesis
| 
| align=center| 3
| align=center| 5:00
| London, England
| 
|-
| Win
| align=center| 5–1–1
| Dave Vader
| Submission (triangle choke)
| 2H2H 6: Simply the Best 6
| 
| align=center| 1
| align=center| 3:40
| Rotterdam, Netherlands
| 
|-
| Win
| align=center| 4–1–1
| Bob Schrijber
| Decision
| 2H2H 5: Simply the Best 5
| 
| align=center| 2
| align=center| 3:00
| Rotterdam, Netherlands
| 
|-
| Win
| align=center| 3–1–1
| Matt Frye
| KO (punches)
| Cage Wars 2
| 
| align=center| 1
| align=center| N/A
| London, England
| 
|-
| Loss
| align=center| 2–1–1
| Josh Dempsey
| Decision
| Cage Wars 1
| 
| align=center| 2
| align=center| N/A
| Portsmouth, England
| 
|-
| Draw
| align=center| 2–0–1
| Rodney Glunder
| Draw
| Rings Holland: No Guts, No Glory
| 
| align=center| 2
| align=center| 5:00
| Amsterdam, Netherlands
| 
|-
| Win
| align=center| 2–0
| Andre Juskevicius
| KO (punches)
| Golden Trophy 2000
| 
| align=center| 1
| align=center| 0:49
| Orléans, France
| 
|-
| Win
| align=center| 1–0
| Ryuta Sakurai
| TKO (punches)
| Golden Trophy 1999
| 
| align=center| 2
| align=center| N/A
| France
|

References

External links

Official UFC Profile

1973 births
Living people
French mixed martial artists of Black African descent
French male mixed martial artists
Light heavyweight mixed martial artists
Mixed martial artists utilizing Muay Thai
French male kickboxers
Heavyweight kickboxers
French Muay Thai practitioners
Sportspeople from Yvelines
Ultimate Fighting Championship male fighters